Denis Pelizzari (born 11 September 1960) is a French former cyclist. He competed at the 1982 and 1983 World Championships and in the individual road race and the team time trial events at the 1984 Summer Olympics.

References

External links
 

1960 births
Living people
French male cyclists
Olympic cyclists of France
Cyclists at the 1984 Summer Olympics
Place of birth missing (living people)